Hank Wilson's Back Vol. I is an album by singer and songwriter Leon Russell singing as Hank Wilson. The UK edition has a banner printed on the front of the sleeve to the right of Russell's stetson saying "Leon Russell!", presumably as a marketing initiative to promote the album using the strength of Russell's name.

The album was recorded in 1973 at Bradley's Barn, Mount Juliet, Tennessee. The album was mixed at Ardent Studios. The album has classic country and bluegrass tunes and was produced by J. J. Cale, Audie Ashworth, Leon Russell, and Denny Cordell.

Originally released as a vinyl LP, Hank Wilson's Back Vol. I was re-released on CD by DCC Compact Classics in 1990 and again by The Right Stuff Records in 1996.

Background
Leon Russell was born in Oklahoma, had a home in Tulsa, and grew up around country and blues music. After making successful rock albums, touring, and releasing the concert album Leon Live, he returned to his roots under the name of a fictional musical personality: Hank Wilson. Leon Russell and some of his close friends from both Los Angeles and Nashville recorded the honky tonk songs between February 26 and February 28 in 1973.

Leon made a total of four Hank Wilson albums:
Hank Wilson's Back Vol. I (1973)
Hank Wilson, Vol. II  (1984)
Legend in My Time: Hank Wilson Vol. III (1998)
Rhythm & Bluegrass: Hank Wilson, Vol. 4 (2001)
In 2009 Leon released the album Best of Hank Wilson

Charts

Track listing
All songs performed by Leon Russell.  All tracks composed by artist listed.

Side 1
 "Roll in My Sweet Baby's Arms" (Lester Flatt) - 4:25 	 	
 "She Thinks I Still Care" (Dickey Lee) - 4:28 	 	
 "I'm So Lonesome I Could Cry" (Hank Williams) - 3:10 	 	
 "I'll Sail My Ship Alone" (Henry Bernard, Morry Burns, Lois Mann, Henry Thurston) - 2:36 	 	
 "Jambalaya (On the Bayou)" (Hank Williams) - 2:49
 "A Six Pack to Go" (Dick Hart, Johnny Lowe, John Lowell, Hank Thompson) - 2:20 	

Side Two
 "The Battle of New Orleans" (Jimmie Driftwood) - 2:38 	 	
  "Uncle Pen" (Bill Monroe) - 2:15
  "Am I That Easy to Forget" (Carl Belew, Shelby Singleton, W.S. Stevenson) - 2:35 	 	
 "Truck Drivin' Man" (Terry Fell) - 2:11
 "The Window Up Above" (George Jones) - 3:24
 "Lost Highway" (Leon Payne) - 2:18 	
 "Goodnight Irene" (Huddie Ledbetter, John A. Lomax) - 4:01

Bonus Tracks
 "Hey, Good Lookin'" (Hank Williams) - 2:42
 "In the Jailhouse Now" (Jimmie Rodgers) - 5:19

Personnel

Leon Russell -	vocals, producer
Harold Bradley - bass
David Briggs - piano, backing vocals
Jim Buchanan –	fiddle
Billy Byrd - electric guitar
J.J. Cale – electric guitar, producer
Jerry Carrigan - drums
Curly Chalker - steel guitar
Dianne Davidson - rhythm guitar, backing vocals
Pete Drake - steel guitar
Ray Edenton - rhythm guitar, backing vocals
Johnny Gimble - fiddle
Buddy Harman - drums
Millie Kirkham - backing vocals
Grady Martin - electric guitar
Charlie McCoy - harmonica, backing vocals
Melba Montgomery -	backing vocals
Bob Moore - electric upright bass
Weldon Myrick - steel guitar
Carl Radle - electric bass
Hargus "Pig" Robbins - piano
Butch Robins - dobro
Hal Rugg - steel guitar
Billy Sanford - high string and rhythm guitar
Tut Taylor - dobro
Bobby Thompson -	banjo
Pete Wade - electric guitar
Chip Young - high string guitar
Joe Zinkan - electric upright bass
Joe Mills - engineer
Audie Ashworth - producer
Denny Cordell 	- producer

References

External links
Youtube Leon Russell Goodnight Irene in Studio

Leon Russell discography
Leon Russell lyrics
Leon Russell Records
Leon Russell NAMM Oral History Program Interview (2012)

1973 albums
Leon Russell albums
Shelter Records albums
Albums produced by Leon Russell
albums produced by Denny Cordell